Azerbaijan Square is the largest square in Tabriz. The square is in the vicinity of Tabriz International Airport. The aim for this square is mainly to welcoming new passengers who are entering to the city as Capital of Iranian Azerbaijan. It has an area about 125,000 m2 and is the largest square in Iran.

Buildings and structures in Tabriz
Squares in Iran
Transport in Tabriz